The Complete Short Stories of Ernest Hemingway: The Finca Vigía Edition, is a posthumous collection of Ernest Hemingway's (July 21, 1899 – July 2, 1961) short fiction, published in 1987. It contains the classic First Forty-Nine Stories plus a number of other works and a foreword by his sons.

Only a small handful of stories published during Hemingway's lifetime are not included in The First Forty-Nine. Five stories were written concerning the Spanish Civil War: "The Denunciation", "The Butterfly and the Tank", "Night Before Battle", "Under The Ridge", and "Nobody Ever Dies". Excepting "Nobody Ever Dies", these stories were collected in a posthumous 1969 volume with his play, entitled The Fifth Column and Four Stories of the Spanish Civil War. Chicote's bar and the Hotel Florida in Madrid are recurrent settings in these stories.

In March 1951, Holiday magazine published two of Hemingway's short children's stories, "The Good Lion" and "The Faithful Bull". Two more short stories were to appear in Hemingway's lifetime: "Get A Seeing-Eyed Dog" and "A Man Of The World", both in the December 20, 1957 issue of the Atlantic Monthly. 	
	 	
The seven unpublished stories included in The Complete Short Stories of Ernest Hemingway: The Finca Vigía Edition are "A Train Trip", "The Porter", "Black Ass at the Cross Roads", "Landscape with Figures", "I Guess Everything Reminds You of Something", "Great News from the Mainland", and "The Strange Country".

In addition, this volume includes "An African Story", which was derived from the unfinished and heavily edited posthumous novel The Garden of Eden (1986), and two parts of the 1937 novel To Have And Have Not, "One Trip Across" (Cosmopolitan, May 1934) and "The Tradesman's Return" (Esquire, February 1936), in their original magazine versions. 
		 	
The collection is not, despite the title, complete. After Hemingway's suicide, Scribner put out a collection called The Nick Adams Stories (1972) which contains many old stories already collected in The First Forty-Nine as well as some previously unpublished pieces (much of it material that Hemingway clearly rejected). From the new material, only "The Last Good Country" (part of an unfinished novella) and "Summer People" are included in this volume.

For the Hemingway short fiction completist, some readers may turn to the Everyman's Library The Collected Stories (1995), published in the UK only, and introduced by James Fenton. Eschewing the pieces collected in The Garden of Eden and To Have and Have Not, Fenton's collection includes all the pieces from The Nick Adams Stories as well as a number of pieces of juvenilia and pre-Paris stories.

Part I: First Forty-Nine Stories
  Stories from The Fifth Column and the First Forty-Nine Stories (1938)
 The Short Happy Life of Francis Macomber (1936)
 The Capital of the World (1936)
 The Snows of Kilimanjaro (1936)
 Old Man at the Bridge (1938)
From Three Stories and Ten Poems (1923)
 Up in Michigan (1923, revised 1938)
 In Our Time (1925 and 1930)
 On the Quai at Smyrna 
 Indian Camp (1924)
 The Doctor and the Doctor's Wife (1925)
 The End of Something (1925)
 The Three-Day Blow (1925)
 The Battler (1925)
 A Very Short Story (1924)
 Soldier's Home (1925)
 The Revolutionist (1925)
 Mr. and Mrs. Elliot (1924)
 Cat in the Rain (1925)
 Out of Season
 Cross-Country Snow (1924)
 My Old Man 
 Big Two-Hearted River, Part I (1925)
 Big Two-Hearted River, Part II (1925)
 Men Without Women (1927)
 The Undefeated
 In Another Country
 Hills Like White Elephants
 The Killers
 Che Ti Dice La Patria?
 Fifty Grand
 A Simple Enquiry
 Ten Indians
 A Canary for One
 An Alpine Idyll
 A Pursuit Race
 Today is Friday
 Banal Story
 Now I Lay Me
  Winner Take Nothing (1933)
 After the Storm  
 A Clean, Well-Lighted Place  
 The Light of the World  
 God Rest You Merry, Gentlemen  
 The Sea Change  
 A Way You'll Never Be  
 The Mother of a Queen  
 One Reader Writes  
 Homage to Switzerland  
 A Day's Wait  
 A Natural History of the Dead 
 Wine of Wyoming
 The Gambler, the Nun, and the Radio
 Fathers and Sons

Part II: Short Stories Published in Books or Magazines Subsequent to the First Forty-Nine Stories
From To Have and Have Not
One Trip Across (1934)
The Tradesman's Return (1936)
Uncollected stories published in Hemingway's lifetime
The Denunciation (1938)
The Butterfly and the Tank (1938)
Night Before Battle (1939)
Under the Ridge (1939)
Nobody Ever Dies (1939)
The Good Lion (1951)
The Faithful Bull (1951)
Get a Seeing-Eyed Dog (1957)
A Man of the World (1957)
First published in The Nick Adams Stories (1972)
Summer People
The Last Good Country
From The Garden of Eden (Novel) (1986)
An African Story

Part III: Previously Unpublished Fiction
A Train Trip
The Porter
Black Ass at the Crossroads
Landscape with Figures
I Guess Everything Reminds You of Something
Great News from the Mainland
The Strange Country

References

1987 short story collections
Short story collections by Ernest Hemingway